Rhynchospora careyana, known by the common name of broadfruit horned beaksedge, is a member of the sedge family, Cyperaceae. It is found in marshy areas near the Gulf coast of the southeastern United States, from western Louisiana to southeastern Georgia.

References

External links

careyana
Flora of the Southeastern United States
Flora of Florida
Flora of Georgia (U.S. state)
Flora of Alabama
Flora of Mississippi
Flora of Louisiana
Plants described in 1860
Plants described in 1918